A list of notable Finnish lawyers:

A
Pauli Alankoja
Ivar Aminoff
Pentti Arajärvi

B
Christer Boucht

H
Tarja Halonen

I
Rieti Itkonen

J
Niilo Jääskinen

K

Martti Koskenniemi

L
Raimo Lahti

M

Jukka Mikkola

N
Sauli Niinistö

P
Hannele Pokka
Yrjö Pulkkinen

R
Johan Wilhelm Rangell
Juha Rantasila

S
Asser Salo
Martin Scheinin
Helvi Sipilä
Eliel Soisalon-Soininen
Kaarlo Ståhlberg

T
Kari S. Tikka

W
Matti Wuori

 
Law
Finnish